The Dream of Andalusia (Spanish: El sueño de Andalucía) is a 1951 French-Spanish musical film directed by Luis Lucia and starring Luis Mariano, Carmen Sevilla and Arlette Poirier. A separate French film version Andalusia was also made.

Plot 
Luis Mariano is Juanito, an itinerant botijero full of good humor who likes to sing and bullfighting. Carmen Sevilla is Dolores, the daughter of the owner of an inn who is fond of dancing. To prevent everything from being too excessive, the clever ending tells us that we are in a movie within a movie.

Cast
 Luis Mariano as Juanito Var 
 Carmen Sevilla as Dolores  
 Arlette Poirier as Fanny Miller  
 Perrette Souplex as Pilar  
 Liliane Bert as Greta 
 Andrée Moreau as Doña Augustias  
 José Nieto as Vicente  
 Enrique Guitart as Rodríguez Valiente  
 Fernando Sancho 
 Léon Berton as The secretary  
 Jean Berton as The chief of police  
 Janine Zorelli 
 Alexandre Rignault as Pancho  
 Robert Arnoux as Schnell  
 Noël Roquevert as Ricardo Garcia  
 Maurice Baquet as Pepe  
 Marujita Díaz 
 Carolina Giménez
 Cándida Losada 
 Antonio Casal
 Luisa Sala 
 Jacques B. Brunius
 Cadex
 Henri Coutet as The captain 
 Renée Couture
 Paul Demange as Director  
 Pierre Flourens 
 Lucien Guervil
 Mejoto-Benideus 
 Daniel Mendaille as Doctor 
 Morant 
 Mireille Ozy 
 Roseline Prince
 Yvonne Yma

References

Bibliography
 Mira, Alberto. The A to Z of Spanish Cinema. Rowman & Littlefield, 2010.

External links 

1951 films
French musical films
Spanish musical films
1951 musical films
1950s Spanish-language films
Films directed by Luis Lucia
Spanish multilingual films
French multilingual films
1950s multilingual films
Spanish-language French films
1950s Spanish films
1950s French films